Alvania auberiana is a species of minute sea snail, a marine gastropod mollusk or micromollusk in the family Rissoidae.

Distribution

Description
The maximum recorded shell length is 2.1 mm.

Habitat
Minimum recorded depth is 0 m. Maximum recorded depth is 101 m.

References

Rissoidae
Gastropods described in 1842